Bruce Groves (1 March 1947 – 31 January 2014) was a South African cricketer. He played first-class cricket for Border and Natal between 1965 and 1980.

References

External links
 

1947 births
2014 deaths
South African cricketers
Border cricketers
KwaZulu-Natal cricketers
Cricketers from Johannesburg